Thulium(III) chloride or thulium trichloride is as an inorganic salt composed of thulium and chlorine with the formula TmCl3. It forms yellow crystals. Thulium(III) chloride has the YCl3 (AlCl3) layer structure with octahedral thulium ions.

Reactions
The hydrated form of thulium(III) chloride can be obtained by adding thulium(III) oxide to concentrated hydrochloric acid. Thulium(III) chloride reacts with strong bases to make thulium(III) oxide.

References

Thulium compounds
Chlorides
Lanthanide halides